is a female Japanese given name.

 is a Japanese surname, also romanized as Aikoh or Aiko. 

Aiko or Ayko is also a traditional male given name in Scandinavia and especially northern Germany. In Germany it is considered one of the old "gentry names". It is a variation of the name Ekke or Eike. Ekke translates to "blade". 

As a male given name in West Nile, Aiko is a shorter variation of the name Ayiko.

Possible meanings
The meaning varies depending on the kanji used to write it.  Several written forms include:
  — Love, child, child of love
  — Love fortune.
  — Hollyhock and child; the same kanji can be used to write Riko and Kiko as well as the more similar Aoko, Aoiko, and Ako.
 - Indigo, child.
In West Nile, Aiko originates from the root Ayiko which means "happiness" in Lugbara. Aiko can also mean "salt lack (no salt)" or "salt trapping (catching)".

Notable people with this name

 Aiko (singer) (愛子), a Japanese singer-songwriter
 Aiko, Princess Toshi (愛子内親王), a Japanese princess
 Aiko Anzai (安西愛子), a vocalist and politician
 Aiko Asano (浅野愛子), an actress and singer
 Aiko Dinale (愛子), a Japanese Italian Robot scientist
 Aiko Doden (道傳愛子), a news presenter
 Aiko Fukumorida (福盛田藍子), a manga artist
 Aiko Gibo (宜保愛子), an occultist
, Japanese synchronized swimmer
 Aiko Iguchi (井口愛子), a pianist
 Aiko Ikuta (幾田愛子), a singer
 Aiko Itō (いとうあいこ), an actress
 Aiko Kaito (皆藤愛子), an announcer
 Aiko Kayo (嘉陽愛子), a pop singer
 Aiko Kitahara (novelist) (北原亞以子), a novelist
 Aiko Kitahara (singer) (北原愛子), a singer
 Aiko Klostermann, a German computer scientist
 Aiko Melendez, popular actress in the Philippines
 Aiko Mimasu (三益愛子), an actress
 Aiko Miyake (三宅愛子), a freestyle swimmer
 , Japanese badminton player
 , Japanese sculptor
 Aiko Moriyama (森山愛子), a singer
 Aiko Nakagawa, a street artist also known as Lady Aiko
 Aiko Nakamura (中村藍子), a professional tennis player
 Aiko Okumura (奥村愛子), a singer
 Aiko Onozawa (:ja:小野沢 愛子), a Japanese former volleyball player
, Japanese sailor
, Japanese writer
, Japanese actress
, Japanese judoka
 Aiko Shimajiri (島尻あい子), a politician
 Aiko Takahama (高浜愛子, born 1984), women's professional shogi player
 Aiko Uemura (上村愛子), a mogul skier
 Jhene Aiko, an American singer/songwriter

Fictional characters
 Aiko, an anime-style 3D figure created by DAZ3D
 Aiko Senoo (妹尾 あいこ), a character of the shōjo anime Ojamajo Doremi
 Aiko Miyazaki (Honey Lemon), a Marvel Comics superhero associated with Big Hero 6, a Japanese team 
 Aiko Tanaka (田中 愛子), a character and the primary love interest of the slice of life manga Oyasumi Punpun
 Aiko Takada, a character from the fantasy manga Elfen Lied
 Aiko Yumi, a Japanese college professor and a dateable character in the dating simulation videogame HuniePop

See also
 
 

 A.I.C.O. -Incarnation-, a 2018 Japanese original net animation produced by studio Bones

References

Japanese feminine given names